Qianling Town is a town and the county seat of Baojing County in Hunan, China. The town is located in the mid-eastern region of the county, it is bordered by Yongshun County to the east, Purong and Wanmipo Towns to the north, Fuxing Town and Huayuan County to the west, Yangchao and Changtanhe Townships to the south.

References

Baojing County
County seats in Hunan